Amt Elsterland is an Amt ("collective municipality") in the district of Elbe-Elster, in Brandenburg, Germany. Its seat is in Schönborn.

The Amt Elsterland consists of the following municipalities:
Heideland
Rückersdorf
Schilda
Schönborn
Tröbitz

Demography

References

Elsterland
Elbe-Elster